Tirop is a surname. Notable people with the surname include: 

Agnes Tirop (1995–2021), Kenyan long-distance runner
Amos Tirop Matui (born 1976), Kenyan long-distance and marathon runner
Sammy Tirop (born 1959), Kenyan middle-distance runner